The 1982 NAIA World Series was a double-elimination tournament to determine the baseball champion of the National Association of Intercollegiate Athletics (NAIA). The tournament was held at Chaparral Stadium on the campus of Lubbock Christian College in Lubbock, Texas from May 31 through June 5. The Grand Canyon Antelopes won the tournament, the team's third consecutive NAIA baseball championship.

Participants

Tournament

Bracket
To be added

Game results

Notes

References

External links
Official website

NAIA World Series
Baseball in Lubbock, Texas
NAIA World Series
NAIA World Series
NAIA World Series
NAIA World Series
Events in Lubbock, Texas
Sports competitions in Texas